Foral Union of the Basque Country (UFPV) was a Spanish party alliance formed to contest the 1979 general election in the Basque Country by the Democratic Coalition and the Basque Independent Democrats. It maintained contacts to reach an alliance with the Union of the Democratic Centre (UCD), but these proved fruitless.

Member parties
Democratic Coalition (CD)
Basque Independent Democrats (DIV)

References

Defunct political party alliances in Spain